Hilton Head Island High School (shortened to Hilton Head High, HHIHS, or HHH) is a public high school within the Beaufort County School District, located in Hilton Head Island, South Carolina, United States.  The high school serves students on the island in addition to some students living in Bluffton through the Beaufort County School District "school choice program".

Academics
Hilton Head Island High School is accredited with the Southern Association of Colleges and Schools. The school is partnered with the International Baccalaureate Programme.

Athletics
Hilton Head Island High School competes at the Class AAAA level in the South Carolina High School League.  The school fields teams for boys in football, wrestling, basketball, swimming, cross country, track & field, lacrosse, tennis, and golf; and for girls in cheerleading, volleyball, basketball, swimming, cross country, track & field, lacrosse, tennis, and golf. The Seahawks have won the S.C. Athletic Administrator Association's Carlisle Cup for eight consecutive years (up to 2017–18 school year).

Notable alumni

Poona Ford, National Football League (NFL) football player for the Seattle Seahawks
Ryan Kelly, baseball player
Sean O'Haire, former professional wrestler and mixed martial artist
Wayne Simmons, football player

See also
Beaufort County School District

References

External links
 School website
 2012 school report card by S.C. Department of Education

Schools in Beaufort County, South Carolina
Public high schools in South Carolina
International Baccalaureate schools in South Carolina
Hilton Head Island, South Carolina